Donnan is a surname. Notable people with the name include:

 Christopher B. Donnan, archaeologist
 Frederick G. Donnan, chemist
 Harry Donnan, Australian cricketer
 Jim Donnan, a former American football player and coach
 William G. Donnan, Iowa politician

See also
Donan
Donen